Tzur is a Hebrew given name and surname literally meaning "rock". Notable people with the surname include:

Given name
Tzur Shezaf, Israeli author

Surname
Assaf Tzur, Israeli footballer
 David Tzur (born 1959), Israeli politician and former policeman
 Dov Tzur (born 1956), Israeli politician and mayor of Rishon LeZion
 Ronen Tzur (born 1969), former Member of Knesset
 Tzvi Tzur (1923 – 2004), Israeli officer
 Ya'akov Tzur (born 1937), former Israeli politician
 Ze'ev Tzur (1911 – 1994), Israeli politician

See also 

Ben-Tzur
 Zur
 Jacob Tsur

Hebrew-language surnames